Saint-Nicolas Church is a Catholic church in Hérémence, Switzerland, known for its brutalist modern architecture.

Sources 

 Pierre Imhasly, Oswald Ruppen, Jacques Dominique Rouiller, Hérémence Béton, Lausanne : Ed. du Grand-Pont, 1974, 105 p.
 

Cultural property of national significance in Valais
Churches in Switzerland
Modernist architecture in Switzerland
Religious buildings and structures completed in 1971
20th-century churches in Switzerland